Kammu can refer to:
 Emperor Kanmu
 Kammu language
 Kammu people